The 1900 Washington Agricultural football team was an American football team that represented Washington Agricultural College during the 1900 college football season. The team competed as an independent under head coach William L. Allen and compiled a record of 4–0–1.

Schedule

References

Washington Agricultural
Washington State Cougars football seasons
College football undefeated seasons
Washington Agricultural football